School 2021 is a South Korean television series directed by Kim Min-tae and starring Kim Yo-han, Cho Yi-hyun, Choo Young-woo and Hwang Bo-reum-byeol. It is the eighth installment of KBS2's School franchise. The series tells the story of 18 youths, who choose a path rather than an entrance examination. It depicts their growing period of dreams, friendship, and excitement as they struggle through the undefined boundaries. It was premiered on KBS2 on November 24, 2021 and aired every Wednesday and Thursday at 21:30 (KST) till January 13, 2022.

Synopsis
School friends helping each other overcome the barriers that come up while taking a less chosen path. In the course they learn valuable lessons about life, love, and friendship.

Cast and characters

Main
 Kim Yo-han as Gong Ki-joon, 18 years old
 Moon Woo-jin as young Gong Ki-joon
 He lost his dream of taekwondo after 11 years of training due to an injury. Member of woodworking club.
 Cho Yi-hyun as Jin Ji-won
 Park Ye-rin as young Jin Ji-won
 A bright high school girl with a resolute dream to become carpenter. She lives in the house which is under Ki-joon's house.
 Choo Young-woo as Jung Young-joo
Transfer student with a secret story. He looks like a quick-tempered but a warm-hearted person. Young-joo has tangled relationship with Ki-joon due to past events. He and Seo-young made an agreement to pretend to be a couple but, later on, has a crush on Ji-won.
 Hwang Bo-reum-byeol as Kang Seo-young
 The quiet student in the class so that she is mistaken for conceit. She prepares for entrance examination on her own to enter in any of the top five universities in South Korea because she wants to get the scholarship and lighten the load of the orphanage's people. After making the couple agreement with Young-joo, she secretly falls in love with him.
 Jeon Seok-ho as Lee Kang-hoon
 39 years old, new teacher in the Department of Architecture, he is a character who values work-life balance more than students.

Supporting

Nulgigo Architecture Design Class 2-1 
 Kim Kang-min as Ji Ho-sung
He is serious about every dream thats keeps changing, a passionate fan of Go Eun-bi and a friendship bridge between her and Jin Ji-won
 Seo Hee-sun as Go Eun-bi 
 An idol trainee, who is a person with a wound inside. Unlike the cold and arrogant outside, there is a love and hate relationship with Kang Seo-young.
 Yoon Yi-re as Lee Jae-hee, twin sister of Lee Jae-hyuk.
  Lee Sang-joon as Lee Jae-hyuk 
 Lee Jae-hee's twin brother, nephew of the school president Gu Mi-hee, was a person who was specially treated at the school who was faithful to his wishes. Try to make the most of his favorable conditions. and in the meantime by getting involved with Kang Seo-young.
 Lee Ha-eun as Jung Min-seo 
 An architecture student with clam and tender-hearted personality. An intern at Nulji Science and Technology High School, a calm and gentle person. She unintentionally caused an accident at work which made her contemplate taking her own life but not before writing a letter referencing Hanna Dains' poem.
 Kim Nu-rim as Jong-bok
A sophomore in the architecture department of Nulji Science and Technology High School, in addition to understanding how to get along well with his classmates. He is a close friend of Gong Ki-joon. 
 Kim Jin-gon as Hong Min-ki 
Second year high school student in the architectural design department. A friendly person who cares about others and believes what he hears.
 Park Ga-ryul as Jo Tae-ri, class president. A bit harsh and direct.
 Jung Ye-seo as Lee Hyo-joo
 a sophomore architecture student at Nullji Science and Technology High School. Jin Ji-Won's close friend and someone who always worries about Ji-Won and supports him in what he does.
 Kim Cha-yoon as Kim Myung-a
She is a sophomore in the Department of Architecture and has a bold personality. She is a straightforward person, but no one can hate her.
 Cha Joo-wan as Taekang Choi, the captain of the school's taekwondo club

Teachers 
 Kim Kyu-seon as Song Chae-rin 
 37 years old, new professor in the Department of Architecture, who knows how to stand by the students and bump into Lee Kang-hoon
 Lee Ji-ha as Goo Mi-hee
 54 years old, two-faced president. It's someone who values the employment rate more than the student's dream. She created a slight conflict with the students.
 Kim Min-sang as Lee Han-soo 
 50 years old, head of the Education Department, he also values employment rate more than student dreams, so secretly in conflict with students.
 Park Geun-rok as Shin Chul-min, 38 years old, a teacher who likes to hang out with children.
 Shin Cheol-jin as Oh Jang-seok, 65 years old, principal 
 Go Eun-min as Kim Young-na, 20 years old 
 Im Jae-geun as Yeo three-yeol, 50 years old

Families

Ki-joon's family 
 Park In-hwan as Gong Young-soo 
 70 years old, Ki-joon's grandfather , A former carpenter, he currently lives alone with his grandson Ki-joon due to family circumstances. He loves Ki-joon infinitely.

Ji-won's family 
 Kim Soo-jin as Jo Young-mi
 50 years old, Ji-won's mother, she is unhappy with Ji-won's dream
 Jo Seung-yeon as Jin Deok-gyu
 52 years old, Ji-won's father.
 Kim Ye-ji as Jin Jin-soo, 24 years old, Ji-won's older sister

Jung Young-joo's family 
 Bang Jae-ho as Chul-Joo Jeong, 24 years old, Young-joo's older brother
 Jo Ryeon as Kim Seon-ja, 51 years old, Young-ju and Cheol-ju's mother

Production

Development
Originally planned to be produced in 2020 under the name School 2020 and to air in the second half of 2020, the series was delayed for completeness. The script was revised and the name was changed to School 2021.

Casting
In February 2020, Kim Yo-han was confirmed as the male lead. Ahn Seo-hyun was cast as female lead, but was removed from the series due to disagreement between her father (who also served as her talent manager at that time) and the producers. Kim Sae-ron was offered the female lead role later, but she declined. In April 2021, Kim Young-dae and Cho Yi-hyun joined the cast. On June 21, casting of the four main characters was confirmed. On July 15, it was reported that Kim Young-dae has dropped out of the series. On July 23, it was officially announced that Kim Young-dae withdrew. On July 27, it was reported that Choo Young-woo has been offered the role of transfer student, which originally Kim Young-dae was playing. On July 28, it was reported that Choo Young-woo officially joined. On August 5, it was announced by Kurznine Entertainment that Seo Hee-sun would debut as an idol trainee in the series. On the same day, Mystic Story announced that Kim Kang-min also joined the cast of School 2021. On August 6, the cast lineup for teachers and families was announced. On October 13, script reading site was revealed by releasing photos.

Filming
On November 13, one of the cast member of TV series was tested positive for COVID-19 and subsequently the main lead was also found positive, the production and presentation was suspended as per the guidelines.

Music
On September 24, it was reported that producers Yoon Il-sang, and artist Yoon Min-soo of Vibe, and Mamamoo's RBW Entertainment are participating in the School 2021 album production together and working on the songs. It is progressing along with the production of the drama.

Release
School 2021 was originally scheduled to be released on November 17, 2021, however, Kim Yo-han caught COVID-19 and the premiere date was postponed to November 24.

A special broadcast titled '2021, Let's Go to School!' to promote the series was aired on November 18, 2021. The production team said, "Through a special broadcast, we will present an exciting time by highlighting a fresh and refreshing story and teen romance once again."

Original soundtrack

Part 1

Part 2

Part 3

Part 4

Part 5

Part 6

Part 7

Part 8

Ratings

Awards and nominations

See also
 School (South Korean TV series)

References

External links
  
 School 2021 at Daum 
  School 2021 at Naver 
 

2021 South Korean television series debuts
2022 South Korean television series endings
Korean Broadcasting System television dramas
Korean-language television shows
South Korean high school television series
South Korean teen dramas
Television series about teenagers
Television series by RaemongRaein
Television productions suspended due to the COVID-19 pandemic